The Diocese of Kiteto is a northern diocese in the Anglican Church of Tanzania: its current bishop is the Rt Revd Isaiah Chambala.

Notes

Anglican Church of Tanzania dioceses
 
Manyara Region